Stolen Hours is a  1963 British-American drama film directed by Daniel Petrie and starring Susan Hayward as a socialite with a brain tumor who falls in love with her surgeon's colleague. The film also stars Michael Craig, Edward Judd and Diane Baker.

The film is a remake of the 1939 Bette Davis film Dark Victory (1939), with Hayward in Davis's role. The time period was updated and the setting changed to England. It was shot at Shepperton Studios and on location around Britain, including at Fowey in Cornwall.

The film's American title is Summer Flight.

Plot
A neurotic jet-setting socialite is diagnosed with a brain tumor and told that she has only a year left to live. She falls in love with Dr. John Carmody and struggles to turn her life around before she dies.

Cast
 Susan Hayward as Laura Pember
 Michael Craig as Dr. John Carmody
 Diane Baker as Ellen
 Edward Judd as Mike Bannerman
 Paul Rogers as Dr. Eric McKenzie
 Robert Bacon as Peter
 Paul Stassino as Dalporto
 Jerry Desmonde as Colonel
 Ellen McIntosh as Miss Kendall
 Gwen Nelson as Hospital Sister
 Peter Madden as Reynolds
 Joan Young as Mrs. Lambert
 Joan Newell as Mrs. Hewitt
 Chet Baker as Himself

References

External links
 
 
 
 

1963 drama films
1963 films
British remakes of American films
Films directed by Daniel Petrie
United Artists films
British drama films
Films shot at Shepperton Studios
1960s English-language films
1960s British films